Pierre Zimmer (15 December 1927 – 22 May 2010) was a French actor and film director. He appeared in more than 30 films and television shows between 1966 and 2001. In 1962 he directed the film Give Me Ten Desperate Men, which was entered into the 12th Berlin International Film Festival.

Partial filmography

 Give Me Ten Desperate Men (1962, director)
 Le deuxième souffle (1966) - Orloff
 Judoka-Secret Agent (1966, director)
 Qualcuno ha tradito (1967)
 Life Love Death (1969) - L'officier de police
 La Promesse (1969) - Philippe
 Eden and After (1970) - Duchemin
 Le Voyou (1970) - Martine's Husband
 N. a pris les dés... (1971)
 Le Silencieux (1973) - Le nouveau mari de Maria
 OK patron (1974) - Pascal Costi
 And Now My Love (1974)
 Gloria (1977) - Hervé de Clermont
 Flashing Lights (1978) - Paul Raymond, Monique's father
 Comment se faire réformer (1978) - Le capitaine
 Madame Claude 2 (1981) - McBride
 Keeping Track (1986) - Jamisson
 Aux yeux du monde (1991) - Le Procureur Latour
 XXL (1997) - Baptiste Bourdalou

References

External links

1927 births
2010 deaths
French male film actors
French male television actors
French film directors
French male screenwriters
French screenwriters
Male actors from Paris